La Valse à Mille Temps is Jacques Brel's fourth album. Also known as Jacques Brel 4 and American Début, the album was released in 1959 by Philips. The album was reissued on 23 September 2003 under the title La Valse à Mille Temps as part of the 16-CD box set Boîte à Bonbons by Barclay (980 816-6).

Track listing

Credits 

 Jacques Brel – composer, vocals
 François Rauber – orchestra conductor
 Jean-Marie Guérin – mastering
 J. Aubert – photography 
 M. Apelbaum – photography

The melody of "La Mort" is partly based, uncredited, on the traditional Gregorian chant Dies irae, which has been quoted in a large number of other works over the centuries.

References 

Jacques Brel albums
1959 albums
Patter songs
Songs about dancing
Philips Records albums
French-language albums
Barclay (record label) albums
Universal Records albums
Albums conducted by François Rauber